Dinosol Supermercados S.L. is a Spanish chain of supermarkets operating on the Canary Islands. The current structure dates back to 2012, when a group of Canary shareholders, which mainly consisted of AJA investments, bought the company.

History 
In 1978, the two brothers Domínguez established the brand HiperDino. In 1996, when the brand consisted of three stores, they sold it to Vista Capital, a venture in which Banco Santander participated. Vista Capital renamed the stores to Superdiplo. Subsequently, Dutch multinational Ahold bought the supermarkets and named them Ahold Supermercados SL. However, Ahold suffered some serious losses and they sold their Spanish business to English private equity firm Permira who renamed the group to Dinosol SL. In 2011, DinoSol's debt had mounted to more than 400 million euros, after which the company ended up in the hands of an extensive group of banks, including Bank of Scotland Plc, Caja Madrid and Societe Generale SA. In 2012, a group of Canary shareholders, led by José Abraham Domínguez, Andrés Domínguez – the brothers Domínguez – and Javier Puga, decided to buy DinoSol. In 2012, DinoSol agrees to sell the SuperSol chain to Agile Finance.

At present 
After taking control over the group, the brothers Domínguez and Javier Puga resumed the successful strategy from the past: low prices, alongside competitive and promotions focused on local products. Their company policy was focused on reaching an island society that suffered from high unemployment rates.

It didn’t take long before this new approach bore fruit. Predatory pricing paved the way for growth and the group regained lost market share. One year after the acquisition, Grupo DinoSol was a well-performing company that generated more than 1,000 jobs.

Now, Grupo DinoSol boasts more than 200 locations, on five Canary Islands, and employs over 6,000 people. The company includes:

 HiperDino, large supermarkets and hypermarkets with extensive offerings
 SuperDino, relatively small neighborhood supermarkets with less extensive offerings
 HiperDino Express, small supermarkets located in tourist areas

The group added two new units in 2014:
 EcoDino10, ecological supermarket
 DinoShop11, stores inside BP gas stations

In 2015, consultancy firm Stiga awarded Hiperdino a national prize concerning customer satisfaction, based on valuations by supermarket customers.

References

External links
Bloomberg
Permira
 Business report on Dino 

Supermarkets of Spain
Spanish brands
Private equity portfolio companies